The PAGCOR Tower was a proposed  tall observation tower near Manila Bay in Parañaque, Metro Manila, Philippines. The tower was meant to be constructed as the landmark of the now opened Pagcor City (or Entertainment City Manila), an integrated leisure area with hotels, shopping malls, convention centers and casinos. If built, it would have been one of the tallest towers in the world.

Malaysian conglomerate Genting Berhad is responsible for the concept of the tower

The project was conceptualized during the administration of Pagcor chairman Efraim Genuino. However, in 2010, it was reported that the project was under review after Cristino Naguiat took over as Pagcor's chairman. Naguiat has stated that plans for the tower among other projects "would likely be scrapped" despite continued development of Entertainment City.

See also
List of tallest buildings in Metro Manila

References

Unbuilt buildings and structures in the Philippines
Observation towers in the Philippines
Proposed buildings and structures in Metro Manila